Molla Sarab (also Romanized as Mollā Sarāb) is a village in Gavdul-e Gharbi Rural District, in the Central District of Malekan County, East Azerbaijan Province, Iran. At the 2006 census, its population was 912, in 195 families.

References 

Populated places in Malekan County